Sergei Vasilyevich Volobuyev (born 27 October 1972) is a former Russian football player.

References

1972 births
Living people
Soviet footballers
Russian footballers
FC Dynamo Stavropol players
Russian Premier League players
FC Chernomorets Novorossiysk players
FC Anzhi Makhachkala players
FC Luch Vladivostok players
FC Slavyansk Slavyansk-na-Kubani players
Association football defenders